The women's Keirin at the 2016 Olympic Games in Rio de Janeiro took place at the Rio Olympic Velodrome on 13 August. This was the second time that the event was held at the Olympics, after making its debut in London four years prior.
 
The event was won by Elis Ligtlee from the Netherlands, silver went to Becky James from Great Britain and Australia's Anna Meares won bronze.

The previous title holder, Britain's Victoria Pendleton, did not compete as she announced her retirement at the end of the 2012 London Games.

The medals were presented by Timothy Fok, IOC member, Hong Kong and Brian Cookson, President of the UCI.

Competition format

The Keirin races involved 5.5 laps of the track behind a motorcycle, followed by a 2.5 lap sprint to the finish. The tournament consisted of preliminary heats and repechages, a semi-finals round, and the finals. The heats and repechages narrowed the field to 12. The semi-finals divided the remaining 12 into six finalists. The finals round also included a ranking race for 7th to 12th place.

Schedule 
All times are Brasília Time

Results

First round
Top two in each heat qualified directly for the second round; the remainder advanced to the first round repechages.

Heat 1

Heat 3

Heat 2

Heat 4

 Relegation for riding on the blue band during the sprint

First round Repechages
The winner of each heat qualified for the second round.

Heat 1

Heat 3

Heat 2

Heat 4

Second round
First three riders in each semi qualified for the final; the remainder advanced to the small final (for places 7-12).

Heat 1

Heat 2

Relegation for entering the sprinter's lane when the opponent was already there

Finals
The final classification is determined in the ranking finals.

Final (places 7-12)

Final (places 1-6)

References

keirin
Cycling at the Summer Olympics – Women's keirin
Women's events at the 2016 Summer Olympics
Olymp